The Red Tape Outtakes (Demos And Heartbreaks), released August 2005, is the fifth release from Lucky Boys Confusion.

Track listing
 "Straight from the Top" - 2:41
 "Love You from the Top" - 3:17
 "Drugs (We're Alright)" - 1:42
 "Rolling Rock" - 3:23
 "Evidence" - 2:26
 "Hardest Part" - 2:55
 "City to City" - 3:28
 "One More Chance" - 1:38
 "Hey" - 2:25
 "Needle in My Arm" - 2:54
 "Le Chanson du Soldat" - 5:07
 "The Power (live)" - 4:37

Lucky Boys Confusion albums
2005 compilation albums